The 1949 Rutgers Queensmen football team represented Rutgers University in the 1949 college football season. In their eighth season under head coach Harvey Harman, the Queensmen compiled a 6–3 record, won the Middle Three Conference championship, and outscored their opponents 266 to 138.

Schedule

References

Rutgers
Rutgers Scarlet Knights football seasons
Rutgers Queensmen football